Turbonilla curta is a species of sea snail, a marine gastropod mollusk in the family Pyramidellidae, the pyrams and their allies.

Description
The shell grows to a length of 8.3 mm.

Distribution
This marine species occurs in the following locations at depths between 0 m and 1170 m:
 Caribbean Sea: Colombia, Mexico, Venezuela
 Gulf of Mexico: East Florida, Louisiana, Texas
 Atlantic Ocean: North Carolina, West Florida

References

 Clessin, S. 1900. Die Familie der Eulimidae. Systematisches Conchylien-Cabinet 1(28): 41-224, pl. 10-36.

External links
 To Biodiversity Heritage Library (8 publications)
 To Encyclopedia of Life
 To USNM Invertebrate Zoology Mollusca Collection
 To ITIS
 To World Register of Marine Species

curta
Gastropods described in 1889